The 2001 Benson & Hedges Cup was the thirtieth edition of cricket's Benson & Hedges Cup. The competition was won by Surrey County Cricket Club, who defeated Gloucestershire County Cricket Club in the final at Lord's on 14 July.

Midlands/West/Wales Group

North Group

South Group

Quarter-finals

Semi-finals

Final

See also
Benson & Hedges Cup

References

2001 in English cricket
Benson & Hedges Cup seasons